A Grigri (styled as GriGri or GRIGRI) is an assisted braking belay device manufactured by Petzl designed to help secure rock-climbing, rappelling, and rope-acrobatic activities.  Its main characteristic is a clutch that assists in braking under a shock load. The success of this device has led to grigri becoming a common name for devices of this type. In 2011 a new version, the Grigri 2, was released to replace the original 1991 model. Petzl released the Grigri+ in 2017, adding safety features to the original design, and 2019 saw the release of an updated version of the device, simply called the Grigri. It is named for the African amulet gris-gris, believed to protect the wearer from evil.

Mechanism of operation
The Grigri works by pinching the rope when it is moving quickly (like in a fall), making it an assisted braking belay device. This function distinguishes it from traditional belay devices such as a Sticht plate or an ATC, whose braking mechanisms depend entirely on the user controlling the rope in a specific manner to increase or decrease friction. Inside the Grigri, the rope runs along a cam; the cam allows the rope to pass if moving slowly but rotates when the rope moves more quickly, blocking further movement by pinching the rope against the inside of the device.

Uses and limitations
Petzl recommends the device for lead belaying and top-rope belaying.

When used correctly, the Grigri's camming mechanism can assist in holding a climber that is working a route, or hanging on the rope while trying to figure out a climb. When belaying, the same technique for "taking in" that is used with an ATC or similar device is used. While paying slack out into the system, if the device is held open by pressing on the cam and the climber falls, the device will not lock unless the belayer stops holding it open.

Each generation of the Grigri has a lower limit for the rope diameter for which the cam will engage; the manufacturer recommends the Grigri 2 to be used only with 8.9 to 11mm diameter ropes.

This device has just one place for installing rope and it can't be used in climbing with half rope.

This device is not suitable for left-handed belay technique. There is a sharp edge on the side that will fray rope if used left-handed, but a smooth flange to protect the rope while belaying right-handed. However, there are special techniques that allow left-handed belayers to use this device, like reorienting it to face the other way.

Big wall use

While the Grigri was designed as a belay device, some big wall climbers (such as those climbing Yosemite's Half Dome or El Capitan) have invented novel ways to extend its use and compromise its safety. For example, some big wall rope soloists use the Grigri (sometimes slightly modified) as a self-feeding hands-free self-belay device. It has also seen use by the second to self-belay while jumaring the rope as one half of the ascender pair. The manufacturer holds uses outside of those validated come with considerable risks, and its official documentation goes so far as to expressly prohibit certain uses.

Parts of the GriGri and GriGri+ 
There are seven parts that the GriGri and the GriGri+ have in common.

 Moving side plate
 Cam
 Cam axle
 Friction plate
 Handle
 Fixed side plate
 Attachment holes

The GriGri+ has two additional components:

 Selector knob
 Lock button

References

External links

Grigri (rock-climbing)
Video: Belaying the leader with a Grigri
Petzl GriGri Review with videos

Caving equipment
Climbing equipment
Mountaineering equipment